Safronovskaya is a rural locality (a village) in Vinogradovsky District, Arkhangelsk Oblast, Russia. The population was 4 as of 2010.

Geography 
Safronovskaya is located 32 km southeast of Bereznik (the district's administrative centre) by road. Konetsgorye is the nearest rural locality.

References 

Rural localities in Vinogradovsky District